Franklyn Bruce Modell (September 6, 1917 – May 27, 2016) was an American cartoonist who contributed over 1,400 cartoons to The New Yorker during a period of over 50 years from 1946.

Franklyn Bruce Modell was born on September 6, 1917 in Philadelphia.

He was a graduate of the Philadelphia Museum School of Industrial Art, after which he served in the US Army in World War II in a signal radio intelligence company as a sergeant.

Modell died on May 27, 2016 at his home in Guilford, Connecticut.

References

1917 births
2016 deaths
American cartoonists
American magazine illustrators
Artists from Philadelphia
The New Yorker cartoonists
People from Guilford, Connecticut
University of the Arts (Philadelphia) alumni